Valeria Roffino (born 9 April 1990) is an Italian long-distance runner who specializes in the 3000 metres steeplechase, who won three national championships at individual senior level from 1981 to 1985 in two different specialities.

Biography
She finished eleventh at the 2007 World Youth Championships and at the 2008 World Junior Championships, and ninth at the 2015 Summer Universiade. She also competed at the 2011 European U23 Championships and the 2014 European Championships without reaching the final.

Her personal best time is 9:53.82 minutes, achieved in July 2014 in Rovereto. She became Italian champion in 2014 and 2015, and also in the 5000 metres in 2017.

National titles
 Italian Athletics Championships
 3000 m steeplechase: 2014, 2015
 5000 m: 2017

See also
 Italian all-time lists - 3000 m steeplechase

References

External links
 

1990 births
Living people
Italian female steeplechase runners
Italian female long-distance runners
Athletics competitors of Fiamme Azzurre
Competitors at the 2015 Summer Universiade